Edisto Island is one of the Sea Islands in South Carolina.

Edisto may also refer to:

Edisto, Orangeburg County, South Carolina, an unincorporated community
Edisto people, a subgroup of the Cusabo people of South Carolina